Immanuel's Church is a Protestant church in Jakarta, Indonesia. It is considered one of the oldest churches in Indonesia. It stands on the corner of Jalan Medan Merdeka Timur and Jalan Pejambon, part of the 19th century's Weltevreden district, renamed and transformed into Gambir. The church is the only one in Jakarta that conducts some of its services in Dutch. It also performs services in Indonesian and English.

History

The first idea for the construction from the Dutch Reformists and the Lutherans in Batavia (Jakarta). Construction started in 1834, per the design of J.H. Horst. The laying of the first stone was on 24 August 1835 and completion exactly four years later. The Church was christened as Willemskerk to honour King William I of the Netherlands. It is considered one of the first civic building in the Koningsplein (later Merdeka Square).

In 1843, a Bätz organ was installed; it was restored in 1985.

The church also keeps a Dutch State Bible printed from 1748 by Nicolaas Goetzee of Gorinchem.

Building
The all-brick church with stone columned and pedimented portico is built in Indies Empire style. It sits above a 3-meter foundation. The doors are of solid teak decorated with brass for handles and keyholes. It has a very broad dark grey-brown dome, surmounted by a white, panel-glazed, cupola topped by a miniature of the same dome in style and material.  Other sides have more white pillars and tall white cornices, for the flat roof projections which are stone-clad, above.

The church has a circular layout with a diameter of 9.5 meters covered in grey marble tiles. Chairs are arranged circularly, with the state lectern used by the Governor of Batavia.

See also
List of church buildings in Indonesia
History of Jakarta

References

Works cited

External links

Churches in Jakarta
Churches completed in 1839
Colonial architecture in Jakarta
Cultural Properties of Indonesia in Jakarta
Dutch colonial architecture in Indonesia
Central Jakarta